Arto Markus Laatikainen (born May 24, 1980) is a Finnish professional ice hockey defenceman. He is currently playing with HPK of the Finnish Liiga. Laatikainen was selected by the New York Rangers in the 7th round (197th overall) of the 1999 NHL Entry Draft.

Laatikainen played the 2013-14 season for hometown club, Espoo Blues in the Liiga. He played 614 league games for Espoo Blues, which is more than any other player ever played for the team.

Notable awards and honours
2007-08: Pekka Rautakallio trophy for best defenceman of the season in the SM-liiga

Career statistics

Regular season and playoffs

International

References

External links

1980 births
Living people
Espoo Blues players
Färjestad BK players
JYP Jyväskylä players
New York Rangers draft picks
Södertälje SK players
Finnish ice hockey defencemen
Sportspeople from Espoo